Outback Radio 2WEB is a community radio station broadcasting from Bourke, situated in far western New South Wales.  Its broadcast area serves the communities of Bourke, Cobar, Nyngan, Coonamble, Walgett, Lightning Ridge, Wilcannia and many other towns and villages in western New South Wales, south west Queensland and north east South Australia.

History
2WEB started as a school project inside a small room at Bourke High School after suggestion by science teacher Colin Elliot. Funding was provided from the Disadvantaged Country Area Program in 1977, with equipment installed and the first broadcasts reaching an audience within a 200-kilometre radius of the school grounds the following year.

On November 13, 1978, the very first 2WEB broadcast went to air. After several years of operation and fundraising, 2WEB moved to purposely built premises in Oxley Street which they still occupy today.

In 2003, five FM translator services were installed to complement the AM signal in the towns of Coonamble (91.1 FM), Lightning Ridge (90.5 FM), Nyngan (100.7 FM), Walgett (104.9 FM) and Wilcannia (99.9 FM).

In January 2018, 2WEB acquired and resumed publishing Bourke newspaper The Western Herald after its owners decided to cease publication in December 2017.

A new AM transmitter was purchased and installed after local MP Kevin Humphries announced funding of $85,000 in March 2018; later that year, funds were secured to rebuild the three existing studios with the latest digital broadcast and production facilities.

Programming
Programming originates from its Bourke studios and has been refined over the years with regular shifts incorporating locally produced regional news and National News from Nine Radio. Most of the music programming consists of classic hits and country music.

In April 2014, 2WEB launched a local morning program, Outback Mornings, to replace the satellite program from 2UE which was broadcast since 1996, when John Laws held the shift.

References

External links 
2WEB - Outback Radio Official website
 CBAA website

Community radio stations in Australia
Radio stations in New South Wales
Bourke, New South Wales
Radio stations established in 1978
1978 establishments in Australia